John Rossi may refer to:
 John G. Rossi, United States Army general
 John Charles Felix Rossi, English sculptor